The Chief of the General Staff (CGS) is a post in many armed forces (militaries), the head of the military staff.

List 
 Chief of the General Staff (Abkhazia)
 Chief of General Staff (Afghanistan)
 Chief of the General Staff (Albania)
 Chief of the General Staff (Armenia)
 Chief of the General Staff (Australia)
 Chief of the General Staff (Austria)
 Chief of General Staff of Azerbaijani Armed Forces
 Chief of the General Staff (Kingdom of Bavaria)
 Chief of the General Staff (Bulgaria)
 Chief of the General Staff (Canada)
 Chief of the General Staff (Chad)
 Chief of the General Staff (China)
 Chief of the General Staff (Croatia)
 Chief of the General Staff (Czech Republic)
 Chief of the General Staff (Czechoslovakia)
 Chief of the General Staff (Denmark)
 Chief of the General Staff (Egypt)
 Chief of General Staff (Ethiopia)
 Chief of General Staff (Georgia)
 Chief of the General Staff (Germany)
 Chief of the General Staff (Guatemala)
 Chief of the General Staff (Hungary)
 Chief of the General Staff (India)
 Chief of the General Staff (Israel)
 Chief of the General Staff (Iraq)
 Chief of the General Staff (Kazakhstan)
 Chief of the General Staff (Kenya)
 Chief of the General Staff (Kyrgyzstan)
 Chief of the General Staff (Kuwait)
 Chief of the General Staff (Lithuania)
 Chief of the General Staff (Republic of Macedonia)
 Chief of the General Staff (Moldova)
 Chief of the General Staff (Montenegro)
 Chief of the General Staff (North Korea)
 Chief of General Staff (Pakistan)
 Chief of the General Staff (Poland)
 Chief of the General Staff (Portugal)
 Chief of the General Staff (Prussia)
 Chief of the General Staff (Russia)
 Chief of the General Staff (Romania)
 Chief of the General Staff (Senegal)
 Chief of the General Staff (Serbia)
 Chief of the General Staff (Slovakia)
 Chief of the General Staff (Slovenia)
 Chief of the General Staff (Somaliland)
 Chief of the General Staff (Sweden)
 Chief of the General Staff (Syria)
 Chief of the General Staff (Taiwan)
 Chief of the General Staff (Tajikistan)
 Chief of the General Staff (Transnistria)
 Chief of the General Staff (Turkey)
 Chief of the General Staff (Turkmenistan)
 Chief of the General Staff (Ukraine)
 Chief of the General Staff (United Kingdom)
 Deputy Chief of the General Staff (United Kingdom)
 Chairman of the Joint Chiefs of Staff (United States)
 Chief of the General Staff (Uzbekistan)
 Chief of the General Staff (Vietnam)
 Chief of the General Staff (Yugoslavia)

See also
General Staff (disambiguation)
Chief of staff
Chief of Army Staff (disambiguation)
Chief of the Air Staff (disambiguation)
Chief of the Armed Forces (disambiguation)
Chief of the Defence Staff (disambiguation)
Chief of the Naval Staff (disambiguation)

+